Computer Weekly is a digital magazine and website for IT professionals in the United Kingdom. It was formerly published as a weekly print magazine by Reed Business Information for over 50 years. Topics covered within the magazine include outsourcing, security, data centres, information management, cloud computing, and mobile computing to computer hacking and strategy for IT management.

History 
The magazine was available free to IT professionals who met the circulation requirements. A small minority of issues were sold in retail outlets, with the bulk of revenue received from display and recruitment advertising. The magazine is still available free as a PDF digital edition. Computer Weekly was available in print and digital format and the readership was audited by BPA Worldwide, which verified its circulation twice yearly.  The circulation figure was 135,035 according to the publisher's statement in August 2007.

Bryan Glick is the editor-in-chief of Computer Weekly, having joined in November 2009.

Computer Weekly won the UK Periodical Publishers Association (PPA) "Campaign of the Year" Award five times in seven years as it was involved in IT-related campaigns such as the costs of the NHS computer system, websites for disabled people and the Chinook crash on Mull of Kintyre.

The magazine was transferred to a digital edition in May 2011 after  TechTarget bought the Computer Weekly website and events. On September 22, 2016, the magazine celebrated its 50th anniversary. At the time, its circulation figure was 200,000 magazines per week, and 400,000 magazines once monthly and quarterly regional editions were counted.

On 28 July 2021, Computer Weekly launched the voting for its Most Influential Woman in UK Technology awards.

Website
The website, ComputerWeekly.com, provides users with IT news and analysis, white papers, and case studies. ComputerWeekly.com also provides information via webinars, podcasts, blogs, desktop alerts, and RSS feeds.

The site also features the "Downtime" is a section of the magazine that included a daily 2 column Dilbert comic strip.

Webinars
Webinars are presented on the site, lasting 45 minutes, beginning with a 5-minute introduction from the chair followed by presentations from an analyst and a specific case study. Viewers can email the panel with their questions throughout the webinar.

Users are required to register for each webinar and this is then viewed using an interface that allows users to watch the video of the webinar alongside supporting PowerPoint presentation slides.

The interface allows the user to enlarge and download slides, view speaker information, and supporting case studies.  When viewed on-demand, the user can also pause, skip and select specific sections from the webinar to view.

Podcasts 
Podcasts are audio downloads provided in an MP3 format which are available on-demand. They are generated by the ComputerWeekly.com editorial team.

Blogs
The blogs cover key issues facing IT decision-makers and bloggers include David Lacey, Cliff Saran, Karl Flinders, Matt Scott, Adrian Bridgwater, and Caroline Baldwin.

Computer Weekly CW500 club
The Computer Weekly CW500 Club is a forum for senior IT directors in UK organizations. The club was launched in 1993 and was set up to provide business inspiration and networking opportunities for heads of IT.  Membership is by invitation only, and members meet once a month in London to hear their peers talk on topical IT management issues.

UKtech50
In 2010, Computer Weekly launched the UKtech50 – a list of the 50 most influential people in the UK IT. The list is composed annually and announced at an event, typically in late November or early December. Past winners of UKtech50 are Philip Clarke, then the CIO of Tesco and now its CEO; Mike Lynch, founder and then-CEO of Autonomy; and Warren East, CEO of ARM.

References

External links
 

1966 establishments in the United Kingdom
2011 disestablishments in the United Kingdom
Computer science in the United Kingdom
Defunct computer magazines published in the United Kingdom
Internet properties established in 2011
Magazines established in 1966
Magazines disestablished in 2011
Online magazines published in the United Kingdom
Online magazines with defunct print editions
Weekly magazines published in the United Kingdom